Henrique Cymerman Benarroch (born 23 March 1959) is an Israeli journalist of Portuguese and Spanish origin who works as a correspondent in the Middle East for SIC, La Vanguardia and Mediaset España, among others. He works in five languages: English, Spanish, Portuguese, French and Hebrew. He is the President of the Chamber of Commerce and Industry between Israel and The GCC (Persian Gulf States).

Biography 
Cymerman was born in Oporto, Portugal to a Portuguese father and a Spanish mother – his father being an Ashkenazi Jew of Polish descent and his mother a Sephardic Jew of Moroccan descent. He decided to move to Israel on his own at age 16. He graduated in Social Science at Tel Aviv University and holds a master's degree in the branches of Political Science and Labor Studies. Years later, he worked as a lecturer in that same center and perfected his knowledge of Hebrew and Arabic until he was hired in 1982 by the Israeli newspaper Maariv to work as a correspondent in the Iberian Peninsula.

In 1991 he started working as a correspondent in the Middle East for the Spanish newspaper La Vanguardia, a job he combined from 1992 onwards with being a correspondent for the Spanish television channel Antena 3. It is in 2014 when Henrique bets for Mediaset España, abandoning Antena 3 after working for them for more than 20 years. Henrique also worked as a correspondent for the Portuguese network SIC and has appeared on numerous occasions on the BBC, as well as in Israeli and Palestinian channels. He was the last person to interview former Israeli Prime Minister Yitzhak Rabin, 24 hours before his assassination.

Henrique Cymerman has covered current affairs in the Middle East for more than 25 years. Over time he has developed many relationships of trust with those heading the chief regional political processes in Israel, the Middle East, and the Arab world, allowing him to serve as a unique bridge between the nations involved in the Arab-Israeli conflict.

During the 2010s, he became the first Israeli journalist in history to do a TV broadcast from Dubai, Abu Dhabi, Qatar, and Saudi Arabia.

Cymerman is also a lecturer on Middle East Studies in the Faculty of Government, Strategy and Diplomacy in the Interdisciplinary Center for Higher Education in Herzliya, Israel.

Between 2005 and 2012, he published the book Voices from the Center of the World: The Arab-Israeli Conflict told by its Protagonists in six languages (Spanish, Portuguese, Hebrew, Arabic, Brazilian edition and English). The book includes interviews with key characters in the region, such as Yasser Arafat; Shimon Peres; Hamas leader Ahmed Yassin; Omar bin Laden, son of Osama bin Laden; Mahmoud Abbas; and Yitzhak Rabin's last interview.

Henrique Cymerman directed the TV documentary series Jihad Now, in which he explores the roots of radical Islam, al-Qaeda and Islamic State. The show aired in 2016.

Henrique Cymerman and Pope Francis 
In June 2013, Henrique Cymerman had a meeting with Pope Francis in which he suggested the Pope visit the Holy Land.

Pope Francis’ journey to the Holy Land took place on May 24–26, 2014. Henrique Cymerman, who became an admirer of Pope Francis’ leadership skills, also suggested he organize an encounter between Palestinian President Mahmoud Abbas and Israeli President Shimon Peres, which the Pope proposed turning into a "prayer ceremony" that would take place in "his home," the Vatican, and which both leaders accepted. This offer was immediately qualified by Le Figaro as an unprecedented historical gesture in favor of peace between Israelis and Palestinians. Cymerman sustains that the Middle East is currently going through one of its most difficult moments since the Second Intifada: the peace process promoted by the United States is at an impasse, especially because they never succeeded in bringing together both parties of the conflict and because of their insistence in pursuing a bilateral path instead of adopting a regional approach, wherein Israel would forge alliances with the Sunni Arab States.

Henrique Cymerman coauthored with Jorge Reis-Sá the book Francis: From Rome to Jerusalem (Guerra e Paz, Portugal, 2014), a book that narrates Pope Francis' journey to the Holy Land.

Voluntary work 
Henrique is a member of SOS Children's Villages, an NGO for which he organizes meetings and lectures in order to raise funds. He was also a committee member of the association No2 Violence Against Women. He has been invited to deliver lectures for Taglit, the IDF and Aman, as well as for the IDF's intelligence units and spokesperson's unit, for army preparatory programs and for Israel's ministry of Foreign Affairs. He has also lectured in many international Jewish organizations during his travels visiting Jewish communities all over the world.

Distinctions 
 He received the highest decoration of Portugal, that of Commander of the Order of Prince Henry.
 Pope Francis called Henrique Cymerman "angel of peace" and presented him with a low relief engraving of the angel of peace defeating the demon of war for his help in making possible the encounter with Abbas and Peres in the Vatican.
 Henrique Cymerman was nominated for the Nobel Prize for Peace in 2015 for making possible the prayer for peace in the Vatican.
 In 2012, king Juan Carlos I granted Henrique Cymerman the Order of Civil Merit.
 He was awarded the Daniel Pearl Award in 2012 by the Anti-Defamation League.
 In 2009, he was awarded the Godó Award for Journalism.
 Since 2008, he has a table in his honor in the dining room of the Academia General del Aire, the military academy of the Spanish air force.
 Winner of the New York Festivals Award in 1997 in the category Television News Programs and Inserts | Best News Documentary/Special for his documentary report A suicide bomber in the children’s room.

Notes

References 

1959 births
Living people
Israeli journalists
Jewish journalists
Israeli Jews
Tel Aviv University alumni
Israeli people of Ashkenazi descent
Israeli people of Portuguese-Jewish descent
Israeli people of Polish-Jewish descent
Israeli people of Sephardi descent
Israeli people of Spanish-Jewish descent
Israeli people of Moroccan-Jewish descent
Portuguese emigrants to Israel